Paris Union School District 95 is a school district headquartered in Paris, Illinois.

It serves much of the Paris city limits and some unincorporated areas just outside of Paris.

Schools
 Memorial Elementary School
 Carolyn Wenz Elementary School
 Mayo Middle School
 Paris Cooperative High School (now a cooperative high school under its own board of education)

References

External links
 
School districts in Illinois
Education in Edgar County, Illinois